WWE Hall of Fame (2004) was the event which featured the introduction of the 5th class to the WWE Hall of Fame. The event was produced by World Wrestling Entertainment (WWE) on March 13, 2004 from the Hilton Hotel in New York City, New York. The event was hosted by Gene Okerlund.

In 2004, WWE relaunched the Hall of Fame to coincide with WrestleMania XX. This ceremony, like its predecessors, was not broadcast on television, however, it was released on DVD on June 1, 2004. In March 2015 the ceremony was added to the WWE Network.

Inductees

Individual

Celebrity

References

WWE Hall of Fame ceremonies
2004 in professional wrestling
2004 in New York City
Events in New York City
March 2004 events in the United States
Professional wrestling in New York City
Jesse Ventura